Matt White (born August 23, 1989) is an American professional ice hockey player. He is currently playing under contract with Eisbären Berlin of the Deutsche Eishockey Liga (DEL).

Playing career
In 2007 the native Californian began his junior career playing for the Omaha Lancers in the United States Hockey League (USHL). In the 2009–10 USHL season he was named the Player of the year as well as the most successful goal scorer in the league.

He went on to play NCAA hockey for the Omaha Mavericks from 2010 to 2013.

In 2013–14 season White played in the ECHL for the Ontario Reign. During his professional rookie season he earned with 57 points the most successful player from his team.

Within the same period White also played for the U. S. National Inline Team at the IIHF Inline Hockey World Championship. He won a gold medal 2013 and a bronze medal 2014 and was named the most successful goal scorer in the 2014 tournament.

In 2014 he began playing for the Austrian Hockey League in the team of Ljubljana. After 11 games in Europe he again played for his previous ECHL-team Ontario Reign.

He began the 2015–16 season in the ECHL with the Manchester Monarchs, on December 2, 2015, he was promoted to the American Hockey League (AHL) from the Milwaukee Admirals. He continued to play for the Admirals one more season.

In the 2017–18 season White returned to Europe and signed a contract with the Augsburger Panther, a team of Germany's highest level hockey league Deutsche Eishockey Liga (DEL). During his first DEL season he ranked as one of the top 10 scorers of the entire league.

After two seasons with the Augsburg in the DEL, White left as a free agent to sign a one-year contract with Russian club, HC Neftekhimik Nizhnekamsk of the KHL, on June 2, 2019. In the following 2019–20 season, White adapted quickly to KHL play positing 15 goals and 34 points in 60 games to lead Neftekhimik in scoring.

At the conclusion of his contract with Neftekhimik, White left as a free agent to continue in the KHL with Latvian based club, Dinamo Riga, on August 6, 2020.

Career statistics

Awards and honors

References

External links

1989 births
Living people
American ice hockey left wingers
American ice hockey right wingers
Augsburger Panther players
Dinamo Riga players
Eisbären Berlin players
Ice hockey players from California
Omaha Lancers players
Ontario Reign (ECHL) players
Manchester Monarchs (ECHL) players
Milwaukee Admirals players
HC Neftekhimik Nizhnekamsk players